Hockey at the 1988 Olympics may refer to:

Ice hockey at the 1988 Winter Olympics
Field hockey at the 1988 Summer Olympics